The 2016 presidential campaign of Miriam Defensor Santiago, a then-incumbent Senator of the Philippines, was announced on October 13, 2015 at a book signing event. Miriam Defensor-Santiago submitted her certificate of candidacy (COC) on October 16, 2015. She was fifth overall in the election and lost to Rodrigo Duterte. Santiago died of lung cancer five months later.

Background

Miriam Defensor Santiago previously ran for president in the elections of 1992 and 1998.

It was reported in March 2014 that Santiago was not interested in vying for a higher post, saying that she would rather support a female candidate for presidency. She said that she had no funds for a presidential campaign, but argued that social media would be a significant factor in the 2016 election.

On July 2, 2014, Santiago announced that she was diagnosed with stage 4 lung cancer. However, she said that her cancer is not metastasic and is expected to be cured within six weeks through molecularly targeted therapy.

In August 2014, Santiago declared that she was open to run as president, saying that she was recovering and considering two other career options: entering the International Development Law Organization based in Rome, or authoring books about foreign policy at the Wilson Center in Washington, D.C.

In November 2014, Santiago announced that she will run for president if she is completely healed of cancer, saying that, at that time, 90 percent of her cancer cells had regressed. She also said that she was considering entering a coalition with the Liberal Party and Nacionalista Party if she decided to run.

On October 26, 2015, a meet-and-greet event in front of UP students was held in UP Bahay ng Alumni (the same place where her co-presidential candidate Grace Poe announced her intention to run for president). Santiago reiterated that she would run for the highest political position in the Philippines for the third time to stop the corruption in the government despite having stage 4 lung cancer:

Running mate

In July 2014, Bongbong Marcos said that he was not discounting the possibility of his running for president and, at that time, he said that his Nacionalista Party had only discussed about their agenda in the 2016 election.

It was reported in September 2014, that Santiago considered Rodrigo Duterte, Grace Poe and Gilberto Teodoro as her running mates.

On October 15, 2015, Senator Miriam Defensor Santiago confirmed Senator Bongbong Marcos as her running mate. Santiago and Marcos are two of the three senators who acquitted Renato Corona in his impeachment trial in 2012 (the other senator was the late Joker Arroyo).

Marcos revealed on January 21, 2016 that his campaign with Santiago would be officially launched in the Ilocos region, his home region. He also said that he and Santiago would campaign separately if possible to maximize their reach.

Santiago and Marcos started their campaigns with a proclamation rally held in Mariano Marcos State University in Batac, Ilocos Norte on February 9, 2016.

Marcos, on the other hand, inaugurated his campaign headquarters in Mandaluyong on February 18, 2016.

Political positions

Corruption
In relation to the Priority Development Assistance Fund scandal, Santiago promised to put those who have pocketed their Priority Development Assistance Fund, commonly known as pork barrel to be arrested.

Governance
According to Defensor Santiago’s running mate Bongbong Marcos, he and the candidate agreed on the importance of good governance.

She has also promised to sign the Freedom of Information Act as the act is an “important tool to promote public accountability.”

Social and economy issues
Defensor Santiago also plans to “aggressively fight the war against illegal drugs”. She has promised to reform the tax system and increase government efficiency, with the goal of keeping the government deficit below 3% of the GDP. Defensor Santiago also plans to invest in public infrastructure, agriculture sector, and government institutions.

RH Law
An advocate of the Reproductive Health Law (RHL), Defensor Santiago was not pleased by the 1 billion peso budget allocation cuts for contraceptives. She said that, if she will be elected, she will work for a full and conscientious implementation of the RHL.

Endorsements

Senate slate
The 10-man senatorial slate of Santiago and Marcos was announced during a campaign event at the Ynares Sports Arena on February 14, 2016.

(*) also running under Partido Galing at Puso.

Aftermath
Five months after the elections, Santiago died in her sleep at exactly 8:52 a.m. on 29 September 2016 while she was confined at the St. Luke's Medical Center in Taguig from lung cancer; several reports cited that Santiago died in her residence in La Vista Subdivision, Quezon City. Her body lay in state at the Cathedral Grottos of the Immaculate Conception Cathedral in Cubao the following day. Following a Catholic funeral Mass, she was interred at the Loyola Memorial Park in Marikina on 2 October, beside the tomb of her son Alexander, who died in 2003.

References

2016 Philippine presidential campaigns